Orafino is an unincorporated community in Frontier County, Nebraska, in the United States.

History
Orafino is derived from a Spanish name meaning "fine ore". This name Orafino was applied to the place when a settler found iron pyrite.

A post office was established at Orafino in 1880 and remained in operation until it was discontinued in 1952.

See also
Orofino, Idaho

References

Unincorporated communities in Frontier County, Nebraska
Unincorporated communities in Nebraska